The Jason is a series of oceanographic altimeter satellites, including:

 TOPEX/Poseidon (1992–2006), a joint-venture between NASA and CNES, predecessor to the Jason satellites
 Jason-1 (2001–2013)
 Jason-2 (2008–2019)
 Jason-3 (from 2016)
 Jason-CS A (Jason Continuity of Service-A), formerly Sentinel-6A, now called Sentinel-6 Michael Freilich (from 2020).
 Jason-CS B (Jason Continuity of Service-B), Sentinel-6B, will launch in 2025